A by-election was held on 9 January 2022 in Taichung to elect one member of the Legislative Yuan for the Taichung City Constituency II (Taichung 2) for the remaining term until 2024. Democratic Progressive Party legislator Lin Ching-yi won the by-election for Taichung 2 to replace Chen Po-wei, who was recalled on 23 October 2021.

Background
In the 2020 Taiwanese legislative election, Chen Po-wei became the first member of the Taiwan Statebuilding Party to be elected to the Legislative Yuan. He narrowly defeated the incumbent Kuomintang legislator Yen Kuan-heng by 2.30 percentage points. Shortly after Chen was sworn in, some pan-Blue politicians (most notably the New Party in June 2020) called for Chen to be recalled, with media sources frequently portraying it revenge for the recall of former Kaohsiung mayor Han Kuo-yu.

On 8 February 2021, a recall effort led by Yang Wen-yuan officially proposed a recall motion against Chen. On 5 March 2021, the Central Election Commission announced that the proposal threshold of 2,912 proposers had been met with 3,744 valid proposers. The second stage, which requires joint signers of the proposal to exceed 10% of the electorate (29,113 signatures), was met with 36,073 valid signatures; the recall vote was formally established on 2 July 2021. The CEC originally planned for a recall vote on 28 August 2021, but postponed it to 23 October 2021 due to the COVID-19 pandemic. Chen , with 77,899 votes in favor, exceeding both the required 25% threshold of 73,744 votes and the 73,433 votes against. Chen became the first legislator to have been recalled. On 28 October 2021, the CEC announced that the by-election to replace Chen would be held on 9 January 2022. Candidate registrations were open from 15 to 19 November 2021.

Candidates
 called in former legislator Yen Kuan-heng to contest the seat. Yen held the seat from 2013, when he won a by-election to replace his father Yen Ching-piao, until 2020, when he lost to Chen Po-wei.
 called in former legislator Lin Ching-yi to contest the seat.

Election
A total of 258 polling stations were open from 8:00 to 16:00 on 9 January 2022. A number of people set up or used cameras near polling stations, in contravention of election law. Yen made a concession speech at 17:50. Political scientist Shen Yu-chung attributed Lin's win to the Democratic Progressive Party's past successes in the 2020 presidential and legislative elections, stating that most voters cast ballots based on party affiliation instead of local issues. Shen believed that the DPP supported Lin's campaign more directly then the Kuomintang supported Yen Kuan-heng. Instead, the KMT utilized the Yen family's local political influence.

Results
The election was won by Lin with 51.83% of votes, retaining the seat for the Pan-Green Coalition.

Notes

References

By-elections
By-elections in Taiwan
January 2022 events in Asia